The Party of Regions was a pro-Russian political party in Ukraine formed in late 1997 that then grew to be the biggest party of Ukraine between 2006 and 2014.

Since the February 2014 Ukrainian revolution, the party has not competed in elections and members have slowly dispersed; the last election the party participated in was the 2012 Ukrainian parliamentary election. The best known former party members are former Prime Minister Mykola Azarov and former President of Ukraine Viktor Yanukovych; both fled to Russia in February 2014 after Euromaidan.

On 21 February 2023 the Eighth Administrative Court of Appeal banned the party.

History

Party of Regional Revival of Ukraine

The founding congress of the Party of Regional Revival of Ukraine was held on 26 October 1997 in Kyiv. The first leader of the party was mayor of Donetsk, Volodymyr Rybak. On 6 November 1997, the Party of Regional Revival of Ukraine was registered at the Ukrainian Ministry of Justice. On 27 November 1997 the 1st Party Congress took place, which adopted the electoral party list and platform for the next elections. On 13 January 1998 a parliamentary faction was created in the parliament of Ukraine, the Party of Regional Revival of Ukraine (head of coordination council – Gennadiy Samofalov).

During the 1998 parliamentary elections the Party of Regional Revival of Ukraine won 0.90% of the votes. A single party representative was elected to the Ukrainian Parliament by winning one constituency at the regular elections. The party was among the top 10 in Chernivtsi and Donetsk Oblasts. Volodymyr Rybak was the winner of constituency number 45 in Donetsk Oblast.

During the 2nd Party Congress that took place in two stages during the spring of 1999 it was decided to support the presidential candidate Leonid Kuchma for the next presidential elections. It was recommended that the candidate include in his election campaign propositions of the Party of Regional Revival of Ukraine, including one on granting the Russian language official status. In the summer of 1999, the party entered the electoral bloc "Our choice – Leonid Kuchma", consisting of 23 parties and led by Yevhen Kushnaryov, who endorsed incumbent President Leonid Kuchma in the presidential election of 1999.

Creation of the Party of Regions
On 17 November 2000, the 3rd Extraordinary Party Congress adopted the merger of five political parties, For Beautiful Ukraine (Leonid Chernovetsky), All-Ukrainian Party of Pensioners (A. Kapusta), Party of Labor (Valentyn Landyk), Party of Solidarity of Ukraine (Petro Poroshenko), and Party of Regional Revival of Ukraine (Volodymyr Rybak), into a new one under the name of Party of Regional Revival "Labor Solidarity of Ukraine". The co-leaders of the new political polity became Valentyn Landyk, Petro Poroshenko, and Volodymyr Rybak. Also, prior to the merger the Party of Solidarity of Ukraine was completely abandoned by its base party of Serhiy Dovhan, the Peasant Party of Ukraine, which dissolved its union with Solidarity. On February 21, 2001, the Ministry of Justice registered the newly established Party of Regional Revival "Labour Solidarity of Ukraine".

On March 3, 2001, at the 3rd Party Congress, the party changed its name to Party of Regions. At the congress Mykola Azarov, who at that time was chairman of the State Tax Administration of Ukraine, was elected the party leader, but soon resigned in December 2001, being replaced by his deputy and at that time Vice Prime Minister Volodymyr Semynozhenko. In an interview with the newspaper Den on 6 March 2001, Azarov said that he agreed to become the chairman for a brief period "until the party nominated a leader who will claim the office of the President of Ukraine in 2004". In December 2001 the Party of Regions member Ihor Yushchko was appointed Minister of Finance of Ukraine. On 21 March 2001, the Ministry of Justice re-registered the party under the number 939 with the older date of registration.

On 23 May 2001, the party signed an agreement of partnership and cooperation with the party Labour Ukraine (Serhiy Tihipko), and on 7 June 2001, with the Agrarian Party of Ukraine.

Regions of Ukraine was the parliamentary wing of the Party of Regions; it was created at the end of March 2001 after several deputies defected from their original faction. Critics claimed the deputies were "lured away" from those other factions by pressure and analysts claimed most of them had nothing to do with the new party. Nine out of seventeen members of the faction had their political and business roots in the Donetsk region. In July 2002 the party had a faction of 24 people (one deputy left the faction later).

On 20 March 2001, Solidarity announced it would "be as a single bloc". (Eventually the (Solidarity) party became part of the Viktor Yushchenko Bloc Our Ukraine during the 2002 parliamentary elections.)

During the Ukrainian parliamentary election the party was a member of the For United Ukraine electoral bloc. It was then led by Volodymyr Semynozhenko.

From 21 November 2002 until 7 December 2004, Viktor Yanukovych was Prime Minister of Ukraine.

At a congress held on 19 April 2003 Viktor Yanukovych was elected party leader, succeeding Volodymyr Semynozhenko. At that time the party had 20 seats in parliament.

Electoral breakthrough
The party shifted its political ideology to the left and became much more populist in nature before the 2004 Ukrainian presidential election and, as a result, Yanukovych won over a large part of the Communist party's electorate in eastern Ukraine. The party announced support for making Russian a second official language in Ukraine, a pro-Russian foreign policy, and increased social spending. It also advocates the regionalist ideology, and many members support making Ukraine a federation.

The Party of Regions moved to opposition after its candidate, Viktor Yanukovych, lost the 2004 presidential election. The party leader first claimed an electoral victory, but strong allegations of electoral fraud triggered a series of events commonly known as the Orange Revolution. In the re-run of the presidential election ordered by the country's Supreme Court, Viktor Yanukovych lost the election to Viktor Yushchenko.

The Party claimed to be a victim of a political persecution campaign organised by the new government, also because Borys Kolesnykov, the head of the regional party branch and of the Donetsk regional council, was arrested in April 2005 and charged with criminal extortion. The Party of Regions claimed this was an act of political repression, while the authorities believed that Kolesnykov had links to organised crime and his arrest was a purely criminal matter. The Council of Europe called the investigation "in full compliance with European standards". Kolesnykov has since been cleared of charges and released from pre-trial detention.

The party signed a collaboration agreement in 2005 with Russia's "United Russia".

American consultant Paul J. Manafort has advised the party and  Yanukovych since 2005.

2006 Parliamentary Election results

At the parliamentary elections on 26 March 2006, the party gained 32.14% of votes and 186 (out of 450) seats in the Verkhovna Rada (the Ukrainian Parliament), forming the largest parliamentary group. On 6 July 2006, the Socialist Party of Ukraine abandoned the "Orange Coalition" between Our Ukraine and the Yulia Tymoshenko Bloc following the failure of each bloc to reach agreement on the formation of a governing coalition.

On 10 July 2006 a new parliamentary majority titled the "anti-crisis coalition", led by the Party of Regions and including the Socialist Party and the Communist Party, was formed, nominating Viktor Yanukovych to the post of prime minister.

The coalition remained in office until the special parliamentary elections held in September 2007.

At the 2006 Crimean parliamentary election the party was part of the For Yanukovych! election bloc.

On 19 January 2007, Yevhen Kushnaryov, a member of the Party of Regions, died in Izium as a result of an accidental gunshot wound received while hunting.

In mid-2007, the Ukrainian Republican Party and Labour Ukraine merged into the Party of Regions.

2007 Parliamentary Election results

At the parliamentary elections held on 30 September 2007, the party won 175 seats (losing 11 seats) out of 450 seats with 34.37% of the total national vote. The party received the highest number of votes, with a swing of +2.23% in comparison to the 2006 vote.

Following the formation of a governing coalition between Our Ukraine and the Yulia Tymoshenko Bloc and the election of Yulia Tymoshenko as prime minister on 18 December 2007, the Party of Regions formed the parliamentary opposition.

On 13 March 2009, Victor Yanukovych stated the Party of Regions was ready to unite into a coalition with its archrivals the Yulia Tymoshenko Bloc (BYuT). He noted that: "We are ready to unite, but only on the base of the program on struggle with crisis". The previous day the deputy leader of the Bloc of Yulia Tymoshenko faction, Andriy Portnov, said that the union of his political force with the Party of Regions was highly improbable, but that the union of the BYuT and the Party of Regions could be possible after the next Ukrainian presidential elections. Prime Minister Yulia Tymoshenko stated on 17 March 2009 that her bloc was ready to join efforts with the Regions Party to pass certain bills in the Ukrainian parliament (Verkhovna Rada). "You are a representative of the Regions Party, [and] I represent the BYuT. It's time to join efforts for the benefit of the country," Tymoshenko said. On 30 March 2009 Victor Yanukovych stated he did not believe in the possibility of forming a coalition with the Yulia Tymoshenko Bloc in the current parliament. At the same time he added that "it would be necessary to agree on main issues" concerning amendments to the Constitution of Ukraine involving local self-government reform, judicial reform and clear division of authority among President, government and parliament. According to Yanukovych, talks with the BYuT were still ongoing in late May 2008.

In early June talks to build a national unity government to address the economic crisis collapsed, and Yulia Tymoshenko accused Yanukovych of betrayal: "He unilaterally, without warning anyone, quit the negotiation process, making a loud political statement, killing the merger and the chances for Ukraine".

In September 2009 Member of Parliament Vasyl Kiselev was expelled from the party and the political council of the Party of Regions. Kiselev was expelled "for violation of provisions and demands of the charter of the Party of Regions and harming the reputation of the party".

In September 2009 Mykola Azarov announced the creation of the Anti-Fascist Forum of Ukraine, the chairmen of which were the member of parliament Dmytro Shentsev (Kharkiv) and the head of the Luhansk Region State Administration, Valeriy Holenko.

Yanukovych presidency

The Party of Regions endorsed Viktor Yanukovych as their candidate for the 2010 presidential election. The party intended to create a new coalition in the Verkhovna Rada and form a new government if Yanukovych won the 2010 presidential elections. Yanukovych was elected President of Ukraine on 7 February 2010. On 19 February the Ukrainian parliament terminated the powers of Ukrainian Member of Parliament (MP) Yanukovych, in his place #179 on the electoral list of the Party of Regions at the 2007 early parliamentary elections. Tamara Yehorenko was registered as an MP by the Central Election Commission of Ukraine on 26 February. On 3 March Ukrainian President Yanukovych suspended his membership in the Party (Yanukovych was barred by the Constitution from heading a political party) and handed over leadership in the party and in the parliamentary faction to Mykola Azarov. Nine days later Azarov handed it to Oleksandr Yefremov. On 11 March 2010, together with Bloc Lytvyn and Communist Party of Ukraine, the party joined the first Azarov Government.

The party elected a new Chairman at its 12th congress on 23 April 2010. Prime Minister Mykola Azarov was elected.

Seven extra deputies (four Bloc Yulia Tymoshenko (BYuT) members) joined the Party of Regions faction in October 2010. In March 2011 five more former BYuT deputies joined the faction. By late November 2012 the Party of Regions faction consisted of 195 lawmakers (20 more than the 175 elected in September 2007).

During the 2010 Ukrainian local elections the party won majorities on most regional and city councils as well as most of the mayoralties (except in Western Ukraine), and in the 2010 Crimean parliamentary election (where it won over 70% of the seats). It was the only party that won representatives in all Ukrainian oblasts where elections were held, and it won the most votes in all but four of those oblasts (the four oblasts where it did not were situated in Western Ukraine). In Crimea, particularly in 2010–2014, the Party of Regions was nicknamed "Makedonians" because the Crimean Prime Ministers Vasyl Dzharty and Anatolii Mohyliov were associated with the "Makiivka-Donetsk clan."

In September 2010, the party was planning to sign a memorandum on cooperation with China's Communist Party.
On 14 October 2010, the Party of Regions formed a co-operative arrangement with the Socialists and Democrats European parliamentary group.

President Yanukovych and the Party of Regions have been accused of trying to create a "controlled democracy" in Ukraine and as a means to this of trying to "destroy" the main opposition party BYuT, but both have denied these charges.

2012 Parliamentary Election results

In August 2011 Strong Ukraine and People's Party announced that both parties aimed to merge with the Party of Regions. The merger between People's Party and Party of Regions did not materialise. Strong Ukraine and Party of Regions merged on 17 March 2012. (Former) Strong Ukraine leader Serhiy Tyhypko was unanimously elected Party of Regions deputy chairman and member of the Party of Regions political council the same day. Party of Regions parliamentarian Olena Bondarenko had stated (early March 2012) that Party of Regions, Strong Ukraine party and "another party" planned to hold a unity congress on 17 March 2012. No additional third party merged with the Party of Regions on 17 March 2012; according to Ukrainian media Tyhypko had personally prevented a merger of United Centre with the Party of Regions in March 2012.

In October 2011 a cooperation agreement was signed in Astana between the Kazakhstani Nur Otan and the Party of Regions.

In late 2011, the party's popularity dropped in opinion polls below 20%, mainly because the party was losing votes to the Communist Party of Ukraine.

In April 2012, the top PR consultancy Burson-Marsteller was hired to represent the interests of the Party of Regions, "to help them communicate its activities as the governing party of Ukraine, as well as to help it explain better its position on the Yulia Tymoshenko case", as explained by Robert Mack, a senior manager at Burson-Marsteller.

In the October 2012 parliamentary elections the party won 72 seats and 30% of the votes under party-list proportional representation (falling from 34% in 2007 and 32% in 2006) and another 115 by winning 115 simple-majority constituencies (it had competed in 204 of the 225 constituencies); this sum gave them a total of 187 seats and 41,56% of the 450 seats in the Ukrainian Parliament. The party had lost about 2 million voters compared with the previous election. On 12 December 2012 the party formed a parliamentary faction of 210 deputies. On 31 December 2013 this faction was 204 votes strong.

At least 18 Party of Regions deputies have criminal ties, according to Hennadiy Moskal, deputy head of Parliament's Committee on Organized Crime and Corruption.

In June 2013, 148 people's deputies of Ukraine signed a letter to the Polish Sejm asking to recognize the Volhynian tragedy as a genocide (:uk:Звернення депутатів від Партії регіонів і КПУ до польського Сейму). A total of 119 of those parliamentarians were members of Party of Regions, while other 23 were from the Communist Party of Ukraine.

Post-Yanukovych presidency

Yanukovych impeachment
From November 2013 until February 2014 Ukraine was gripped by a series of anti-government demonstrations, known as Euromaidan. Goals of Euromaidan were the impeachment of President Yanukovych and snap elections. Late January 2014 the party's symbol and activities were banned in the Chernivtsi, Ternopil and Ivano-Frankivsk regions. Although there was no legal basis for these bans since in Ukraine only a court can ban the activities of a political force. The Party of Regions faction in Zhytomyr announced its dissolution on 19 February 2014, in connection with the crisis of the preceding three months.

On 22 February 2014, during the 2014 Ukrainian revolution, the Ukrainian parliament voted to impeach the honorary chairman of the party, Viktor Yanukovych, as President of Ukraine. Out of the 38 PoR deputies present, 36 voted in favor of ousting Yanukovych, while two did not take part in the vote. Simultaneously both Yanukovych and former Prime Minister Mykola Azarov fled to Russia. In a written statement the next day, the party denounced Yanukovych, stating they "strongly condemn the criminal orders that led to human victims, an empty state treasury, huge debts, shame before the eyes of the Ukrainian people and the entire world." On 24 February 2014 faction leader Oleksandr Yefremov declared that the party was moving into the opposition. 77 of its MPs had left the faction over the past few days. On 25 February 2014 Anatoliy Kinakh and 32 other mostly former PoR deputies created the parliamentary faction Economic Development.

On 28 March 2014 Yanukovych asked the Party of Regions to exclude him. The next day, at a party congress, the party nominated Mykhailo Dobkin as its presidential candidate for the 2014 Ukrainian presidential election. The congress expelled from the party Yanukovych, Azarov, former First Deputy Prime Minister Serhiy Arbuzov, ex-chairman of the Ministry of Revenue and Duties Olexander Klimenko, former Energy Minister Eduard Stavitskyi, ex-governor of the Donetsk region Andrew Shishatskiy and Valery Konovalyuk.

On 7 April 2014 the political council of the party expelled Sergiy Tigipko, Oleh Tsariov and Yuriy Boiko from the party.

Mykhailo Dobkin was the PoR's candidate in the snap presidential election of 25 May 2014, tallying only 3 percent of the vote.

On 3 June 2014 again twenty Party of Regions deputies left the party's parliamentary faction. Thus the faction's strength was reduced from (at its highest point on 12 December 2012) 210 deputies to 80 deputies on 6 June 2014. A by-product of this was that it became the second biggest faction in parliament, after the faction of Batkivshchyna with 85 members. On 2 July 2014 the 32 member strong new parliamentary faction For Peace and Stability, composed mostly of former Party of Regions MPs, was formed. The following months many (former) members of the Party of Regions became objects of the so called "trash bucket challenge" (Ukraine officials dumped in trash containers and the likes).

Criminal case against deputies/party members support for separatism
On September 17, 2014, amidst the ongoing war in Donbas, a group of 24 people's deputies of Ukraine from the Party of Regions and the Communist Party of Ukraine, who are members of the Ukrainian parliamentary group For Peace and Stability, met with Sergei Naryshkin, the chairman of the Russian State Duma. On September 25, 2014, the Central Investigation Administration of the Ukrainian Ministry of Internal Affairs opened a criminal case against those deputies charging them with infringement on the territorial integrity of Ukraine.

The Ukrainian press claims that during the days around the February 2014 Ukrainian revolution several party members called for the disintegration of Ukraine and a union with the Russian Federation. They claim that Oleksandr Yefremov, leader of the Ukrainian parliamentary faction was in full support of these proposed actions, and Vladimir Konstantinov, chairman of the Supreme Council of the Autonomous Republic of Crimea went to Luhansk to support these actions.

2014 Parliamentary Election, disintegration and ban
On 14 September 2014 Party of Regions chose not to participate in the 2014 parliamentary elections; the party deemed the election as lacking legitimacy because the residents of the Donbas could not vote in the election. Many individual members of Party of Regions ended up as candidates of Opposition Bloc. Party of Regions has not participated in elections since the 2012 Ukrainian parliamentary election.

By the summer of 2015 most representatives of the party in 2014 were members of Opposition Bloc, Revival or Our Land. Others continued their political careers in other parties (mostly Petro Poroshenko Bloc); according to Ukrainian media research of February 2016 22% of the Petro Poroshenko Bloc representatives in regional councils and 12% of this party parliamentary deputies were former members of the Party of Regions. In the 2020 Ukrainian local elections former members of Party of Regions were candidates for the Servant of the People party.

Following the 2014 annexation of Crimea by Russia and after Vladimir Konstantinov announced of reorganization of the Party of Regions Crimean branch, members of Party of Regions joined the United Russia. Officially according to the TASS news agency and the former leader of the Crimean Party of Region Konstantinov, there is no succession of the United Russia Crimean branch from the Party of Regions Crimean branch, but, according to several local news resources from Sevastopol, in reality it was organized from former activists of Party of Regions and Russian Unity.

In July 2019 the party’s (former) website redirected to “Golos Pravdy”, a pro-Russia blog website which the Atlantic Council considers to be linked to Fancy Bear and run by politicians that fled Ukraine in 2014.

On 21 February 2023 the Eighth Administrative Court of Appeal banned the party. This ban was initiated by the Ministry of Justice and the Security Service of Ukraine. Because of the Russo-Ukrainian War (leading  to Ukrainian government control lost in parts of the country) in several parts of Ukraine no local elections were held since the 2010 Ukrainian local elections, hence Party of Regions deputies in those territories still have their mandate.

Party's electoral results

In 2012  Taras Kuzio claimed the electorate of the party was very loyal to them. According to a poll by the Kyiv International Sociology Institute, the number of voters ready to go to polling stations to vote for the Party of Regions dropped from 38% in June 2010 to 13.9% in April 2011.

Issue stances

In 2011 the party asserted it had a pragmatic approach to Ukrainian EU membership with respect to the country's foreign economic interests; it supports "to walk the path of European integration and the implementation of respective standards in the social and economic spheres". Yet, given the European financial crisis at the time, the party saw the issue of Ukraine's accession to the EU as "purely theoretical."

The party accepts Ukrainian as the only state language in Ukraine, but also claims to promote "both the development of the state Ukrainian language and languages of other nationalities residing on the territory of Ukraine".

The Party of Regions supports the cancellation of a number of benefits for deputies of the Ukrainian parliament. Leading party members have stated the party "would mercilessly expel corrupt officials from its ranks".

In November 2013 Party of Regions MP Oleh Tsariov demanded a criminal investigation into the activities of United States Department of State lead TechCamp in Ukraine because he believed it was engaged in "preparations for inciting a civil war" because during training "instructors share their experience of Internet technologies, which are aimed at shaping public opinion and enhancing the protest potential and which were used to organize street protests in Libya, Egypt, Tunisia and Syria".

The Party of Regions lost much influence amid the 2014 revolution in Ukraine. 72 deputies left the party; the remaining deputies either supported key opposition demands like impeaching Yanukovich, firing Zakharchenko and the General Prosecutor or did not vote.

On 23 February, the party faction of Verkhovna Rada published a statement blaming everything wrong on ″Yanukovych and his inner circle″, accusing him in particular of giving out ″criminal orders″ and lamenting that the whole party had been ″in effect hostage of one corrupt Family″.

On 7 April 2014 the party presented its new economic doctrine that consisted of minimal taxes and fees, maximum investor protection, increasing investment attractiveness, as well as deregulation and simplification of licensing procedures, the establishment of a transparent tax system and tax cuts (a reduction of income tax to 12.5%, reducing the income tax rate to 14%), decreasing the inspections of small and medium-sized businesses to not more than once in five years, maintaining a 15-year preferential tax system in agriculture, the introduction of effective direct subsidies to farmers to compete on the world market, a compensation of 50% of new fixed assets in crop and livestock in creation of new industries.

Political program

European integration
On the question of European integration, different views exist within the party. On the one hand, President Viktor Yanukovych, who is a member of the party, has repeatedly underlined his pro-European stances. On the other hand, experts have described the Party of Regions as eurosceptic. The Party's official stance is for increased European integration, but within a framework that is favorable to Ukraine.

Domestic policy

The party supports affordable housing through state mortgages with a 3% annual percentage rate, social contracts with employers, financial aid for newborns (to be doubled in 2017), perinatal centers in each region and the upgrading of maternity homes.

The party supports at least 75-percent placement in higher-educational institutions, a minimum-wage student stipend, a minimum 20-percent annual raise in educator salaries and universal Internet access. In labor, the party supports fully subsidizing employers of the disabled, orphans, single mothers and workers over age 50; training the unemployed for occupations with labor shortages; providing internships to students; giving young professionals their first job, and a median salary of ₴8,000 by 2017.

The party supports a median salary of ₴8,000 for physicians and ₴5,500 for other medical personnel, reducing basic-medicine prices by 30 percent, providing access to medicines to patients with cancer, heart disease, tuberculosis and HIV/AIDS, mobile medical facilities in all rural areas, treatment and rehabilitation for people with limited physical abilities and new pools, stadiums, ice arenas and sports fields in all regions.

The party supports comfortable, affordable housing; security for senior citizens; the repayment of all deposits in the Sberbank of the USSR up to ₴5,000 by 2017; a minimum pension 20 percent over the poverty threshold, and significant pension increases for military and law-enforcement personnel. In the environmental sector, the party supports the completion of the Shelter Project for the Chernobyl Nuclear Power Plant by 2015, the installation of 20,000 centralized water-purification systems and recycling plants in each region.

National economy
 Modern economy
 Main goals: GDP growth (at least 5% annually), stability of national currency
 Implementation through gradual reduction of corporate income tax (16% before 2014), introduction of tax holidays for IT and innovation projects for period of 10 years, providing domestic manufacturers with affordable bank loans
 Effective power generation, energy independence
 increase the extraction of domestic coal, oil and shale gas
 begin developing the shelf gas fields
 enhance the use of solar, wind and hydropower
 modernizing power plants for efficient use of domestic coal and other fuels
 Rural policy
 creation of 1,500 agricultural cooperatives
 construction of new elevators, vegetable and fruit storage
 establishing prices for land share (no less than 20,000 hrv/ha) and rent (no lower than 1,000 hrv/ha)
 development of social infrastructure in rural areas (auto roads, hospitals and schools, gas supply)
 Infrastructure policy
 construction of modern automobile roads (with ability to travel from west to east of Ukraine in 14 hours)
 new speed rail link between the capital and regions
 affordable aviation transportation for each Ukrainian
 construction and redevelopment of airports, sea and river ports, rail stations
 construction of new metro stations and development of commuter transportation

Government and society

Effective nation: responsible government and open society
 Civil policy
 intellectual freedom
 freedom of speech
 equal opportunities for women and men in all spheres of life
 legislative support for the native language

 granting to the Russian language the status of the second state language
 Regional policy
 increased role of local government
 60% of consolidated state budget to local councils
 Law enforcement and military policy
 contract army
 abolition of compulsory conscription from January 1, 2014
 Foreign policy
 preservation of the non-aligned status of Ukraine – safety guarantee for every citizen
 gaining associate membership in the European Union, creation of free-trade zone, removal of visa barriers between Ukraine and the EU
 strengthening economic cooperation within the free-trade zone framework with countries of the Commonwealth of Independent States
 strategic partnership with Russia, United States, China
 opening to Ukraine the markets of "Big Twenty" and of developing countries
 realization of competitive advantages of the country for the right to host sporting and cultural events at European and world levels

Selected members
 Mykola Azarov – Chairman
 Oleksandr Yefremov – Deputy Chairman of the Party of Regions on Relations with the Parliament of Ukraine
 Petro Pysarchuk

Vremya Regionov
The Party of Regions publishes a nationwide newspaper called Время Регионов (English trans. Time of the Regions). The newspaper is based and published in Kyiv. It is released weekly, every Thursday, in Ukrainian and Russian. The newspaper was launched on 24 August 2008. It is available online in PDF format.

International cooperation
The party had international cooperation agreements with the following parties:
 : United Russia
 : Progressive Alliance of Socialists and Democrats
: Nur Otan
: New Azerbaijan Party
: Republican Party of Armenia and Prosperous Armenia
: Ar-Namys
: Progressive Party of Working People
: Democratic Left Alliance
: Chinese Communist Party
: Communist Party of Vietnam

See also
 Viktor Yanukovych
 Rinat Akhmetov
 Yevhen Kushnaryov
 Alliance of National Unity
 2006 Ukrainian political crisis
 2007 Ukrainian political crisis
 2008 Ukrainian political crisis
 Politics of Ukraine

References

External links

 Official web site of the party

 Press-center of the central staff on local elections
 Official website of the youth wing of Party of Regions
 Vremya Regionov

 
1997 establishments in Ukraine
Centrist parties in Ukraine
Viktor Yanukovych
Euromaidan
Eurosceptic parties in Ukraine
Parliamentary factions in Ukraine
Banned political parties in Ukraine
Political parties established in 1997
Political parties disestablished in 2023
Regionalist parties in Ukraine
Russian political parties in Ukraine
2016 disestablishments in Ukraine